Virginia's 18th House of Delegates district elects one of 100 seats in the Virginia House of Delegates, the lower house of the state's bicameral legislature. District 18, in Fauquier County, Warren County, Culpeper County, and Rappahannock County, is represented by Republican Michael Webert.

District officeholders

References

External links
 

Virginia House of Delegates districts
Fauquier County, Virginia
Warren County, Virginia
Culpeper County, Virginia
Rappahannock County, Virginia